Ismail Haji Nour is a Somaliland politician and is the current Mayor of Erigavo, the capital of Sanaag region of Somaliland, since October 2003. A well known businessman, he was imprisoned several times during the rule of Siad Barre for alleged dissidence. He is one of the longest serving mayors in Somaliland and the only mayor who has been re-elected.

See also

 Mayor of Erigavo
 Erigavo

References

Living people
Sanaag
Mayors of places in Somaliland
Somaliland politicians
Year of birth missing (living people)